Eye on Malaysia was a transportable Ferris wheel installation in Malaysia. It began operating in Kuala Lumpur in 2007, and was then moved to Malacca in 2008, where it operated until 2010.

Kuala Lumpur
It was unveiled in conjunction with Visit Malaysia Year 2007 on January 6, 2007, by the prime minister at that time, Abdullah Ahmad Badawi.

Kuala Lumpur coordinates:

Malacca City
Eye on Malaysia was relocated to Taman Kota Laksamana, next to the Malacca River in Malacca City in the Melaka Tengah District of Malacca, in late 2008. It ceased operating in January 2010 pending the outcome of a legal dispute between its owners, Fitraco NV, a Belgian leisure equipment leasing company, and the Malaysian operators of the wheel. It was dismantled in October 2010.

Melaka Tengah coordinates:

Malacca Island
It was to be sourced from China and located at Malacca Island, and to have 54 air-conditioned gondolas, each able to carry six people. It was scheduled to open on December 1, 2011, but was never built.

The  Eye on Malaysia, also a Chinese-manufactured wheel with 54 passenger gondolas, was scheduled to begin operating at Malacca Island in April 2013. In November 2012, Mohd Ali Rustam visited the site and stated that the installation of piles had brought the RM40 million wheel to 15 per cent of completion, and that "the installation of the wheel structure will begin in February [2013]."

References

Amusement rides introduced in 2007
Amusement rides that closed in 2010
Buildings and structures in Kuala Lumpur
Buildings and structures in Malacca
Transportable Ferris wheels